"Pray for Me Brother" is a single by Indian composer A. R. Rahman. Released in 2007, being one of the earliest vertical music videos, the song was conceived as an anti-poverty anthem for the Millennium Goals for the United Nations. It is part of a joint venture between the A. R. Rahman Foundation and Nokia.

The song had lyrics by A. R. Rahman and Blaaze with additional lyrics by Sukhwinder Singh. The main vocalist was Rahman himself, while Blaaze accompanied him by providing backing vocals. Clinton Cerejo, Dominique Cerejo, Vivienne Pocha and Hrishikesh Kamerkar have also provided backing vocals.

The video of the album was directed and conceived by Bharatbala of BharatBala Productions, who is a usual associate for Rahman's album videos.
It has been shoot by the ace cinematographer Tassaduq Hussain Mufti.

Rahman said about the song, "It’s a simple song, which will be very unique in its concept. The idea behind this is to spread the message of humanity. We will tell people to preserve humanity."

Background
In 1998, after averting a major crisis in the Middle East through diplomatic means, UN Secretary-General Kofi Annan had spoken the following words, "Never underestimate the power of prayer". In his eyes, it was prayer that finally gave any material means the agency to make the world a better place.

The A. R. Rahman Foundation represents a movement to eradicate poverty through facilitation of education to poor and needy children. As part of the initiative, it has joined with several institutes across the globe. Pray For Me Brother is an initiative by the A.R. Rahman Foundation, with Nokia Corporation to collect funds for the U.N. Millennium Development Programme aimed at eradicating poverty by the year 2015. It is a song about the emotion that lies at the heart of prayer – the emotion of love. It reinstills our faith in love’s power to heal and reminds us that there are those in this world who need of our gestures of healing and comfort. The song was made available for a free download at the official website of U.N. Millennium Goals.

Speaking on the occasion of the audio launch, Rahman said, One thing is common about hunger-everybody feels it. This song is a statement from India to the world. Otherwise we listen and the world talks. I have seen beggars everywhere. This song is not a remedy but an inspiration to do something. World Health Organization official Sathya suggested I should come up with a song for the tuberculosis cause for which U.N. had appointed me as their Brand Ambassador. As I was doing this, I noticed the poverty around that we seem to have become immune to. I called my friend Blaaze and asked if we could do something, hence the song was born, he added.

The film is set primarily in Los Angeles, USA, where progress and plenitude abound. Lives and lifestyles there stand in stark contrast to those parts of the world where pain and suffering abound. The film attempts to bring these two worlds together through its story and in doing so depicts the dawning of a particular realization on its protagonist – that he need not wait for a reason to show kindness, that now was the time for him to offer a healing prayer to his brothers and sisters in need across the world.

Several taglines and quotes that would inspire the world were given within the album art. Some of them were
"Our world spends 736 Billion every year on WAR, Our world spends 130 Trillion every year on weapons of mass destruction. This can provide food, shelter & clothing for all the people in the world, 20 times over."
"Our World Needs a Prayer."
"This song is dedicated to inspire people to eradicate poverty from our world. And to give hope to all people suffering from oppression, injustice and cruelty due to foreign forces or their own cruel leaders. And to those that are deprived of love and compassion. And to fill the void which exists in each and everyone of us. And to those that are searching for a reason to be kind."
"All Perfect Praises Belong to The Almighty Alone."

Music video
The film was conceived and directed by Bharatbala in the banner of BharatBala Productions. The song was picturised in Los Angeles, USA, with cinematography by Tassaduq Hussain Mufti. The choreography was done by Cassel Dixion Jr, Talent Bryan Clark and Adele Jones. The music video was the first to be shot on mobile cinemascope format.

Track listing
The official track listing.

Disc one

Disc two (limited edition DVD)
Pray for Me Brother - Original unedited full length video film in 4:3 aspect ratio.
Making of the video Feat. A. R. Rahman, Blaaze, Bharatbala

Trivia
This song is usually regarded as the first English song by A. R. Rahman. But there were some songs in English, composed and sung by him before "Pray For Me Brother". This include eight songs from his first studio album Shubhaa's Set Me Free, "No Problem" from Love Birds, "I Wanna Be Free" from Tehzeeb (mostly in English), "My Wish Comes True" from Kisna: The Warrior Poet and rap portions from his various film songs. But neither of these songs, were sung by him but was composed by him (except "No Problem" which was co-sung by him). "Musafir" from Vande Mataram (mostly in English) was the first song sung by him.

Album credits

Personnel
A. R. Rahman – vocals
Blaaze - vocals
Srinivas – Sarod
Mikey McCleary – guitar
Christy Samuels - guitar
Carry Hernley – Saxophone
Leigh Ann Woodard – Oboe
Seetha Sivaswamy - Flute

Production
Producers: A. R. Rahman, Mikey McCleary
Executive Producer: Mohan Chopra
Engineers: H. Sridhar, Aditya Modi, S. Sivakumar, P. Deepak
Mixing: Mikey McCleary
Mastering: Mikey McCleary

Design
Artwork : Epigram
Photography: Akin

References

Songs with music by A. R. Rahman
Indian songs
2007 singles
2007 songs
Universal Music Group singles